Tiergarten (German for "zoo") may refer to:

 Tiergarten (park), an urban public park in Berlin
 Kleiner Tiergarten, a smaller public park in Berlin
 Tiergarten, Berlin, a locality within the borough of Mitte which includes the park
 Berlin-Tiergarten station, a railway station adjacent to the park
 "Tiergarten" (song), a song from Rufus Wainwright's album Release the Stars
 Tiergarten (EP), a digital EP with a remix of the song
 "Tiergarten", an instrumental track, by Tangerine Dream, from their 1985 album, Le Parc